Raquel Patricia Arbaje Soneh (born 21 September 1970) is a Dominican businesswoman and children's literature writer. She has served as the First Lady of the Dominican Republic, since August 2020 as the wife of President, Luis Abinader.

Early life
Arbaje is the daughter of businessman Elías Arbaje Farah and Margarita Soneh, who were both of Lebanese descent.  Her uncle is Bartolo Soni who was a professional boxer, older brother of Margarita.She is the third of four siblings, including Ricardo (who is deceased), Eduardo, and Monica. Her father, Elías Arbaje Farah, a businessman who manufactured mattresses, died on 16 November 2009.

Education
Arbaje graduated summa cum laude with business administration degree from the Universidad Iberoamericana (UNIBE) in Santo Domingo. She speaks fluent Spanish, English, and French, and has some knowledge of Italian and Portuguese.

Arbaje is a businesswoman and author of children's literature. She also recorded a song, "'Mi cajita de valores", with the proceeds benefiting the Don Bosco children's nonprofit.

Personal life
She married economist Luis Abinader. Together, the couple have three children – Graciela Lucía, Esther Patricia and Adriana Margarita Abinader Arbaje.
Together with Abinader, Arbaje composed the anthem for the Modern Revolutionary Party, which was co-founded by her husband in 2014.

In June 2020, both Arbaje and Abinader tested positive for COVID-19 during the 2020 presidential election campaign. Both recovered from the coronavirus.

First Lady
Raquel Arbaje became First Lady of the Dominican Republic on 16 August 2020. Unlike her immediate predecessors, President Abinader and First Lady Arbaje announced that the government would eliminate funding for the Office of the First Lady during his presidential tenure. Instead, Arbaje had proposed a much smaller office to handle the schedule and role of the first lady during the 2016 and 2020 campaigns.

References

Living people
Date of birth unknown
Year of birth unknown
First ladies of the Dominican Republic
Dominican Republic businesspeople
Dominican Republic children's writers
Dominican Republic women writers
Dominican Republic composers
Universidad Iberoamericana (UNIBE) alumni
Dominican Republic people of Lebanese descent
White Dominicans
People from Santo Domingo
1970 births